Castaway is a 1986 British biographical-drama film starring Amanda Donohoe and Oliver Reed, and directed by Nicolas Roeg. It was adapted from the eponymous 1984 book by Lucy Irvine, telling of her experiences of staying for a year with writer Gerald Kingsland on the isolated island of Tuin, between New Guinea and Australia.

Real life inspiration 
In 1981, Lucy Irvine responded to an advertisement placed by writer Gerald Kingsland, and they became self-imposed castaways for a year on the isolated and uninhabited island of Tuin, in the Torres Strait between New Guinea and Australia. Chosen by Kingsland from over 50 applicants, Irvine agreed to marry him to satisfy immigration restrictions before they travelled to Tuin. She was 25 years old, and he was 49. After a year, they returned home, and in 1983, she published her account of the experience in Castaway, which was later used as the basis for the 1986 film.

In 2011, Donohoe recalled her experience working with Reed, stating: 'Well, naked on a desert island with Oliver Reed – it was a tabloid fantasy, wasn't it? He was an alcoholic and his behaviour was erratic, but he was always a courteous and good actor. His personal life wasn't working but he never crossed any lines professionally.'

Soundtrack
The film opens with a song by English artist Kate Bush, "Be Kind to My Mistakes". A slightly edited version later appeared on the 1997 re-release of her album Hounds of Love. The soundtrack begins with a different version of the same song, which was also released as a 7-inch single. The rest of the soundtrack album is instrumental and composed by Stanley Myers.  The soundtrack received a limited CD release in 2013.

Cast

Reception

Box office
The film grossed £440,281 in the United Kingdom. Including its gross from the United States, the film grossed over $1 million.

Critical response
The movie received a mixed reception from critics. When Irvine met director Nicolas Roeg, he felt her story was perfect material for telling a relationship between an older man and a younger woman. It never was intended to be exactly like her experience, as Roeg felt Irvine would be too personally involved then. Irvine was positive about the film, stating she was pleased with Donohoe, Reed and Roeg.

References

External links
 
 
 

1986 films
1980s biographical drama films
1980s erotic drama films
British biographical drama films
British erotic drama films
Drama films based on actual events
1980s English-language films
Films based on biographies
Films directed by Nicolas Roeg
Films produced by Rick McCallum
Films scored by Stanley Myers
Films set in Australia
Films set on uninhabited islands
Golan-Globus films
1986 drama films
1980s British films